2017 Empress's Cup Final was the 39th final of the Empress's Cup competition. The final was played at Osaka Nagai Stadium in Osaka on December 24, 2017. Nippon TV Beleza won the championship.

Overview
Nippon TV Beleza won their 12th title, by defeating Nojima Stella Kanagawa Sagamihara – with Mina Tanaka and Mizuho Sakaguchi goal.

Match details

See also
2017 Empress's Cup

References

Empress's Cup
2017 in Japanese women's football